Ninja in the Dragon's Den is a 1982 Hong Kong martial arts film directed by Corey Yuen in his feature film directorial debut, who also writer with Ng See-yuen, who also producer. It stars Conan Lee, Hiroyuki Sanada and Hwang Jang-lee. The film was released on 24 June 1982.

Plot
In Japan of the Tokugawa Ieyasu period, a young ninja named Genbu wantonly kills samurai and other government officials, leaving his clan to face the blame. When they hunt him down, Genbu and his wife Akane sail to China both to escape their wrathful kinsmen and for Genbu to complete his revenge by finding the last man he holds responsible for his father's death.

That man, Fukusa, leads a peaceful life as a mirror maker under the name of Uncle Fu. He has a young protégé, Sun Jing, a smug martial artist who constantly tries to prove himself by taking up every opportunity to fight. Jing also constantly teases his lecherous servant Chee and takes few things very seriously. When he sees his surrogate father attacked, Jing immediately rushes to his aid, but after several clashes he finds out that he and the ninja are evenly matched.

It is revealed that Genbu's father was not killed by his clan members; he died as a hero in a rebellion instead. Ashamed of his own cowardice in escaping to China years before following that attempted uprising, Fu makes peace with Genbu. But before their final encounter, Fu took poison to restore his honor by his own death. Fu asks Genbu to kill him in order to spare him the last agony, which promptly leads to a misunderstanding between Genbu and Jing. The two battle each other to the top of Jing's family temple and eventually settle their differences just in time to face The Magician, a spiritual boxer whose son Jing has insulted in the course of the movie.

The film ends with Jing and Genbu killing the Sorcerer, with some unwitting assistance from Akane and Chee. The latter promptly tempts fate by claiming the better part of the credit for this victory, prompting Genbu and Jing to teach him a lesson.

Cast
 Conan Lee – Sun Jing, one of the main protagonists and a smug but skilled Chinese martial artist. Called "Jay" in the English dub.
 Hiroyuki Sanada – Genbu, one of the main protagonists and a skilled ninja from Japan. Called "Jinbu" in the English dub.
 Tai Bo – Chee, Sun Jing's easygoing and lecherous servant. Called "Charlie" in the English dub.
 Hiroshi Tanaka - Fukusa/"Uncle Fu", the man responsible for Genbu's father death. Called "Fukuda"/"Uncle Lee" in the English dub.
 Kaname Tsushima – Akane, Genbu's wife
 Hwang Jang-lee – The Magician
 Kwan Yung-moon – Sanchiro
 Ma Chin-ku
 Tien Feng
 Wu Jiaxing
 Chen Chin-hai
 Cheung Chung-kwai
 Chin Lung
 Ho Hing-nam
 Alan Lee Hoi-hing
 Ng See-yuen
 Peng Kang
 Wang Yao
 Wei Ping-ao – Doctor in Clinic (Chee's father)
 Yukio Someno – Monk

Reception
In December 2019, the film holds a Rotten Tomatoes rating of 76% based on 277 reviews. Reviews specifically praise the film's dynamics, its unusual story, and its theme song.

DVD release
On 25 March 2002, DVD was released by Hong Kong Legends in the United Kingdom in Region 2.

See also
 Hwang Jang-lee filmography
 List of Hong Kong films of 1982
 List of Hong Kong films
 List of ninja films

External links

References

1982 films
1982 directorial debut films
1982 martial arts films
1980s Cantonese-language films
Films directed by Corey Yuen
Films set in Hong Kong
Hong Kong films about revenge
Hong Kong martial arts comedy films
Japan in non-Japanese culture
Kung fu films
Ninja films
1980s Hong Kong films